Camerlengo (plural: camerlenghi, Italian for "chamberlain") is an Italian title of medieval origin. It derives from the late Latin camarlingus, in turn coming through the Frankish kamerling, from the Latin camerarius which meant "chamber officer" (generally meaning "treasure chamber").

Description
Camerlengo has been used in the papal court for the following official positions:

Camerlengo of the Holy Roman Church
Camerlengo of the Sacred College of Cardinals, lapsed 1997
Camerlengo of the Roman Clergy

Some other positions in the papal court were formerly termed papal chamberlains. Although usually given as an honorary award, the position involved some duties. Laity receiving this honor are now called Papal Gentlemen, while clergy are typically appointed as a "Chaplain of His Holiness", a form of monsignor.

See also 
 Kamerlengo Castle (Croatia)

References

Court titles

io:Kamerlingo
it:Camerlengo
tl:Camerlengo